Fred B. Wells was a Republican politician from Michigan who served in the Michigan House of Representatives from 1915 through 1926. He served as Speaker of the House during the 53rd Legislature.

Wells was born in Wayne Township in 1861 and moved to LaGrange Township at age 5. His parents trace Puritan ancestry to Rhode Island. After attending the local public schools, Wells learned to farm using scientific methods. He was a member of the Masons, the Grange, and the local Farm Bureau.

First elected in 1914, Wells served six terms in the Michigan House of Representatives for Cass County. He worked to reform the state tax system. An unsuccessful candidate for lieutenant governor in 1926, Wells retired to his farm and died on November 25, 1932.

References

1861 births
1932 deaths
American Freemasons
People from Cass County, Michigan
Farmers from Michigan
Republican Party members of the Michigan House of Representatives
Speakers of the Michigan House of Representatives
20th-century American politicians